Jose Wilkson Teixeira Rocha (born 22 March 1992) is a Brazilian professional footballer who plays as a forward for Campeonato Brasileiro Série C club Itapipoca.

References

External links
Jose Wilkson at Soccerway

1992 births
Living people
Association football forwards
Brazilian footballers
Associação Esportiva Tiradentes players
Caucaia Esporte Clube players
Clube Esportivo União players
Senglea Athletic F.C. players
Hibernians F.C. players
Persebaya Surabaya players
Persela Lamongan players
Maltese Premier League players
Liga 1 (Indonesia) players
Brazilian expatriate sportspeople in Malta
Expatriate footballers in Malta
Brazilian expatriate sportspeople in Indonesia
Expatriate footballers in Indonesia
Sportspeople from Fortaleza